Tomarchio is a surname. Notable people with the surname include:

 Bridgetta Tomarchio (born 1978), American actress and model
 John Tomarchio, character in the television series Jericho

Italian-language surnames